Sesay is a common surname among the Mandingo, Temne, Loko, Limba and Kuranko people of Sierra Leone, and may refer to:

Alimamy Sesay (1987–), Sierra Leonean football player
Ansu Sesay (1976–), American professional basketball player
Benjamin Sesay (1981–), Sierra Leonean international football player
Brima Sesay (1981–2009), Sierra Leonean international football goalkeeper
David Sesay (1998–), British football player
Hassan Koeman Sesay (1986–), Sierra Leonean international football player
Hassan Mila Sesay (1987–), Sierra Leonean international football player
Ibrahim Sesay, member of parliament of Sierra Leone
Isha Sesay, British journalist of Sierra Leonean descent and anchor of CNN International
Issa Hassan Sesay (1970–), served as senior officer and commander in the Revolutionary United Front and AFRC/RUF forces in their insurrection against the government of Sierra Leone
Kadi Sesay, formally Kadiatu Sesay, former Sierra Leone Minister of Trade and Industry and mother of CNN International anchor Isha Sesay
Kadija Sesay, also called Kadija George, is a British writer and poet of Sierra Leonean descent
Lamin-Sullay Sesay (1965–2004), also called , Sierra Leonean writer and journalist
Muwahid Sesay (1984–), Sierra Leonean international football striker
Sulaiman Sesay Fullah, Sierra Leonean international footballer
Zainab Bangura (born Zainab Hawa Sesay, 1959–), Sierra Leone minister of foreign affairs